Castronovo Chocolate is a micro-batch chocolate maker headquartered in Stuart, Florida.

History
Denise and Jim Castronovo launched Castronovo Chocolate in 2012 in Stuart, Florida. Castronovo Chocolate sources cacao beans from remote rainforests which are harvested by indigenous people.

Products 
Castronovo Chocolate imports sustainably harvested heirloom cacao beans from Central America and South America for the manufacturing of single-origin chocolate bars. The chocolate maker produces and sells chocolate bars to specialty retail shops internationally.

Recognition 
In 2021 Castronovo was recognized for their dark chocolate by Food & Wine Magazine as among the country's top fifty chocolate makers.

See also
 List of bean-to-bar chocolate manufacturers

References

Stuart, Florida
Companies based in Florida
American chocolate companies